The Tour of Cappadocia is an international road cycling race organized by the Turkish Cycling Federation at Cappadocia in central Turkey. It is part of the UCI Europe Tour with a rating of 2.2.

The tour was held for the first time between June 30-July 3, 2011. The first edition's route was as follows:

  (Prolog - Uçhisar - Kalaba - Hacıbektaş - Gülşehir - Nevşehir - Uçhisar)
  (Nevşehir- Niğde - Nevşehir)
  (Uçhisar - Kalaba - Hacıbektaş - Gülşehir - Nevşehir - Uçhisar)
  (Nevşehir - Ihlara - Nevşehir)

Winners

References

Cappadocia
Recurring sporting events established in 2011
2011 establishments in Turkey
Sport in Nevşehir
Sport in Niğde
Cappadocia
UCI Europe Tour races
Summer events in Turkey